In Love may refer to:

 In love, feeling romantic love

Albums
 In Love (Bunny DeBarge album), 1987
 In Love (Cheryl Lynn album) or the title song, 1979
 In Love (Juli album), 2010
 In Love (Peace album), 2013
 In Love (Wynn Stewart album) or the title song (see below), 1968
 In Love (EP), by Kara, 2015

Songs
 "In Love" (Ronnie Milsap song), 1986
 "In Love" (Wynn Stewart song), 1968
 "In Love", by Brotherhood of Man from B for Brotherhood, 1978
 "In Love", by the Datsuns from The Datsuns, 2002
"In Love",  by Kid Cudi from Entergalactic, 2022
 "In Love", by Lisa Maffia from First Lady, 2003
 "In Love", by Prince from For You, 1978
 "In Love", by Scouts of St. Sebastian, a bonus song from Guitar Hero III, 2007

See also
 
 Falling in love (disambiguation)